Events from the year 2002 in the European Union.

Incumbents
 Commission President — Romano Prodi
 Council Presidency — Spain (January–June), Denmark (July–December)
 Parliament President — Nicole Fontaine (until 15 January), Pat Cox
 High Representative — Javier Solana

Events
 1 January - 
Spain takes over the Presidency of the European Union.
Euro notes and coins issued are in Austria, Belgium, France, Finland, Germany, Greece, Ireland, Italy, Luxembourg, the Netherlands, Portugal and Spain.
 15 January - Irish MEP Pat Cox is elected President of the European Parliament.
 28 February - The Euro becomes the sole legal tender in all 12 Eurozone countries.
 31 May -  All 15 member nations of the European Union ratify the Kyoto Protocol, committing to an 8% cut in carbon dioxide emissions between 2008 and 2012 compared to 1990 levels. 
 1 July - Denmark takes over the Presidency of the European Union.
 19 October - In a second referendum, the electorate of Ireland votes in favour of ratifying the Treaty of Nice.

References

 
Years of the 21st century in the European Union
2000s in the European Union